Marcellus Lamont Greene (born December 12, 1957) is a former American football defensive back who played one season with the Minnesota Vikings in the National Football League (NFL). He was drafted by the Los Angeles Rams in the eleventh round of the 1981 NFL Draft. He played college football at Cincinnati and Arizona. He was also a member of the Toronto Argonauts and Saskatchewan Roughriders.

Early years
Greene attended Shortridge High School in Indianapolis, Indiana.

College career
Greene first played college football in 1977 for the Cincinnati Bearcats of the University of Cincinnati.

He transferred to play for the Arizona Wildcats of the University of Arizona from 1979 to 1980, earning Second-team All-Pac-10 honors both seasons.

Professional career
Greene was selected by the Los Angeles Rams with the 296th pick in the 1981 NFL Draft. He  played in thirteen games for the Toronto Argonauts in 1981. He played in sixteen games for the Saskatchewan Roughriders during the 1982 season.

Greene played in twelve games for the Toronto Argonauts in 1983. He played in fourteen games for the Minnesota Vikings during the 1984 season. He played in 21 games for the Toronto Argonauts from 1985 to 1987.

References

External links
Just Sports Stats

1957 births
Living people
Players of American football from Indianapolis
American football defensive backs
Canadian football defensive backs
African-American players of American football
African-American players of Canadian football
Cincinnati Bearcats football players
Arizona Wildcats football players
Toronto Argonauts players
Saskatchewan Roughriders players
Minnesota Vikings players
Shortridge High School alumni
Players of Canadian football from Indianapolis
21st-century African-American people
20th-century African-American sportspeople